The 1981 Individual Speedway World Championship was the 36th edition of the official World Championship to determine the world champion rider.

It was also the last of a record 26 times that London's world famous Wembley Stadium hosted the World Final. It also marked the final time that the stadium would be used for any Motorcycle speedway. In future years when the final was held in England, it would be held at the Odsal Stadium in Bradford until the advent of the Speedway Grand Prix series in 1995. The 1981 Final was held before a reported crowd of 92,500, just shy of the Wembley record of 95,000 set at the 1938 World Final.

Bruce Penhall became the first American to win the World Championship since Jack Milne in 1937. As a past World Championship winner at Wembley, the 74-year-old Milne was a special guest at the event and saw Penhall end America's 44 year Individual World Championship drought. Though he remained undefeated until his last ride when he only needed to finish 3rd to win the Championship (he finished that race in second behind his rival Kenny Carter), Penhall was forced to work hard for his maiden World Championship. In both Heat 7 and Heat 14 he was second for over 3½ laps behind Ole Olsen and Tommy Knudsen respectively before passing both in the run to the line. Olsen would defeat Knudsen in a runoff for second and third places after both finished on 12 points. The triple World Champion gaining some revenge on his younger countryman after Knudsen had defeated Olsen in the first heat of the meeting.

As this was the final speedway meeting at Wembley it will forever be the track record.

New Zealand Qualification

New Zealand Final

 6 February 1981
  Napier
 First 8 to Austral-Asian Final

Australian Qualification

Australian Final

 February 14, 1981
  Brisbane
 First 8 to Austral-Asian Final

British Qualification

British Final
June 3, 1981
 Coventry, Brandon Stadium
First 8 to Overseas final plus 1 reserve

Swedish Qualification

Intercontinental Round

Australasian Final
February 28, 1981
 Sydney, Liverpool City Raceway
First 4 to Overseas final plus 1 reserve

Norwegian Final

April 26, 1981
 Elgane
First 2 to Nordic final

Danish Final

May 10, 1981
 Fredericia
First 6 to Nordic final

American Final
May 30, 1981
 Los Angeles, Los Angeles Coliseum
First 4 to Overseas final

Nordic Final
June 2, 1981
 Norrköping, Vargarna Speedway
First 6 to Intercontinental final plus 1 reserve

Overseas Final
July 12, 1981
 London, White City Stadium
First 10 to Intercontinental final plus 1 reserve

Intercontinental Final
July 25, 1981
 Vojens, Vojens Speedway Center
First 11 to World final plus 1 reserve

Continental Round

Continental Final
July 25, 1981
 Prague, Marketa Stadium
First 5 to World final plus 1 reserve

World Final
September 5, 1981
 London, Wembley Stadium
Referee: Sam Bass
Attendance: 92,500

References

1981
World Individual
1981 in British motorsport
Individual Speedway World Championship
Speedway competitions in the United Kingdom